The  is a first-class river that runs down from Mount Aso through Kumamoto. In the past the Shirakawa River has overflowed and led to severe flooding such as during the 1953 North Kyushu flood.

References

Rivers of Kumamoto Prefecture
Rivers of Japan